The Melanesia Cup 1998 was the sixth Melanesia-wide football tournament ever held. It took place in Santo, Vanuatu and five teams participated: Fiji, Solomon Islands, New Caledonia, Papua New Guinea and Vanuatu and served for the second time as Oceania Nations Cup qualifyer.

The teams played each other according to a round-robin format with Fiji winning the tournament for the third time and qualifying to the Oceania Nations Cup 1998 along with Vanuatu.

Results

Fiji and  Vanuatu qualified for Oceania Nations Cup 1998

References 

Melanesia Cup
1998–99 in OFC football
1998
1998 in Vanuatuan sport
1998 OFC Nations Cup
September 1998 sports events in Oceania